James Dempster may refer to:
 James Dempster (Methodist), Methodist clergyman
 James Dempster (footballer), Scottish footballer

See also
 Jim Dempster, Mozambican-born British surgeon and researcher